Gelidibacter salicanalis is a Gram-negative and rod-shaped bacterium from the genus of Gelidibacter.

References

Flavobacteria
Bacteria described in 2005